Anand Nagar metro station is a station of Mumbai metro. The station is located in an elevated position on New Link Road in North Mumbai. It serves as a station on Mumbai metro line 2A. The station was inaugurated on 2 April 2022.

History 
Trial runs on section of 2A from Dhanukarwadi to Dahisar East has started from 31 May 2021. Dahisar East commercial operations began on 3 April 2022 with First phase of line 2A.

Station

Platform 
The metro station has 2 side platforms. Platform 1 is used by Dahisar (East) bound trains and platform 2 is used by Andheri (West) bound trains. The side platforms are connected to each other through the second level or mezzanine level of the stations. Both platforms have platform screen doors.

References 

Mumbai Metro stations